Paul Craig (born 2 September 1953) is a Canadian middle-distance runner. He competed in the men's 1500 metres at the 1976 Summer Olympics.

References

External links
 

1953 births
Living people
Athletes (track and field) at the 1976 Summer Olympics
Athletes (track and field) at the 1978 Commonwealth Games
Canadian male middle-distance runners
Olympic track and field athletes of Canada
Commonwealth Games competitors for Canada
Athletes from Toronto